Members of the Wyoming House of Representatives were elected on November 3, 2020, as part of the 2020 Wyoming elections.

Primary elections were held on August 18, 2020. This election featured the first Libertarian state legislator elected anywhere in the United States since 2000, District 39 Representative Marshall Burt.

Retirements
Eleven incumbents did not run for re-election in 2020. Those incumbents are:

Republicans
District 14: Dan Furphy: Retiring
District 31: Scott Clem: Retiring
District 34: Tim Salazar: Retiring
District 46: Bill Haley: Retiring
District 49: Garry Piiparinen: Retiring
District 50: David Northrup: Retiring
District 55: David Miller: Retiring
District 59: Bunky Loucks: Retiring

Democrats
District 17: JoAnn Dayton-Selman: Retiring
District 45: Charles Pelkey: Retiring
District 60: John Freeman: Retiring

Incumbents defeated

In primary elections

Republicans
Five Republicans lost renomination.
District 1: Tyler Lindholm lost renomination to Chip Neiman.
District 4: Dan Kirkbride lost renomination to Jeremy Haroldson.
District 18: Thomas Crank lost renomination to Scott Heiner.
District 40: Richard Tass lost renomination to Barry Crago.
District 52: William Pownall lost renomination to Bill Fortner.

In the general election

Democrats
District 39: Stan Blake lost to Marshall Burt.
District 44: Sara Burlingame lost to John Romero-Martinez.

Predictions

Results summary

Close races

Summary of results by State House District

Detailed results by State House District

District 1

District 2

District 3

District 4

District 5

District 6

District 7

District 8

District 9

District 10

District 11

District 12

District 13

District 14

District 15

District 16

District 17

District 18

District 19

District 20

District 21

District 22

District 23

District 24

District 25

District 26

District 27

District 28

District 29

District 30

District 31

District 32

District 33

District 34

District 35

District 36

District 37 
Speaker of House Steve Harshman won the Republican primary. He ran unopposed.

District 38

District 39

District 40

District 41

District 42

District 43

District 44

District 45

District 46

District 47

District 48

District 49

District 50

District 51

District 52

District 53

District 54

District 55

District 56

District 57

District 58

District 59

District 60

References

Notes

External links
 
 
  (State affiliate of the U.S. League of Women Voters)
 

house
Wyoming House
November 2020 events in the United States
Wyoming House of Representatives elections